Jillian Fargey is a Canadian actress from Vancouver, British Columbia. She is most noted for her performance in the 2000 film Protection, for which she received a Genie Award nomination for Best Actress at the 22nd Genie Awards.

Career 
Fargey is predominantly a stage actress in Vancouver. She is a three-time Jessie Richardson Theatre Award winner, including Best Ensemble with Dmitry Chepovetsky and Michael Northey for their work in Mark Leiren-Young's Basically Good Kids, Best Actress in 1999 for her performance in George F. Walker's Problem Child, and Best Actress (Small Theatre) in 2020 for her performance in Florian Zeller's The Father.

She has had supporting or guest roles in the television series The Beachcombers, Max Glick, The X-Files, Cold Squad, Tru Calling, Terminal City, The Collector, iZombie, The Romeo Section, Bates Motel and Van Helsing, and the films Last Wedding, The Hamster Cage, The Crimes of Mike Recket, The Dick Knost Show, Mount Pleasant and Kingsway.

Filmography

Film

Television

References

External links

20th-century Canadian actresses
21st-century Canadian actresses
Canadian film actresses
Canadian stage actresses
Canadian television actresses
Actresses from Vancouver
Living people
Year of birth missing (living people)